Campton is a village and former civil parish, now in the parish of Campton and Chicksands, in the Central Bedfordshire district of Bedfordshire, England. It is just to the west of Shefford. The 13th century Church of All Saints is in the centre of the village. In 1961 the parish had a population of 358.

It is within the Mid Bedfordshire parliamentary constituency, whose MP is currently Nadine Dorries of the Conservative Party.

History 
Campton is mentioned in the Domesday Book. The entry reads:  Chambeltone: Ralph de Lanquetot from Walter Giffard; Fulbert from Willian d'Eu; Thurstan. The name Campton is derived from a British stream name similar to the name Camel in Cornwall.

On 1 April 1985 the parish was abolished and merged with Chicksands to form "Campton & Chicksands".

References

External links

Parish website

Villages in Bedfordshire
Former civil parishes in Bedfordshire
Central Bedfordshire District